Daniel Sánchez or Sanchez may refer to: 

Dani Sánchez (born 1974), Spanish three-cushion billiards player
Dani Sánchez (footballer) (born 1984), Spanish footballer
Daniel Sánchez (Uruguayan footballer) (born 1961), retired defender
Daniel Sanchez (French footballer) (born 1953), retired striker
Daniel Sanchez (Peruvian footballer) (born 1990), midfielder playing with Sporting Cristal
Daniel Sánchez (wrestler) (born 1968), Puerto Rican Olympic wrestler
Daniel Sánchez Llibre (born 1950), president of Spanish football club RCD Espanyol
Daniel Sánchez Arévalo (born 1970), Spanish screenwriter and film director
 Daniel Sánchez, a character in the 2004 film Man on Fire (2004 film)